"Adictiva" is a song by Puerto Rican rappers Daddy Yankee and Anuel AA. It was released through El Cartel Records on November 9, 2018, and reached the top five in Spain and the top 10 on the US Hot Latin Songs chart. After announcing the song, the music video was released hours later on November 7, 2018, preceding the song's release to streaming platforms.

Critical reception
Rolling Stone noted that the song attempts to "channel" the track "Te Boté".

Charts

Weekly charts

Year-end charts

Certifications

See also
 List of Billboard Argentina Hot 100 top-ten singles in 2019

References

2018 singles
2018 songs
Daddy Yankee songs
Anuel AA songs
Spanish-language songs
Songs written by Daddy Yankee
Songs written by Anuel AA